Hedwig (or Advisa) of France (c. 1003–1063) was a French princess, the daughter of Robert II of France and Constance of Arles. She married Renauld I, Count of Nevers, on 25 January 1016, and they had the following children:
William I of Nevers (c. 1030-1083/1097)
Henry of Nevers (died 1067)
Guy (died 1067)
Robert, Baron of Craon (c. 1035-1098)
Adelaide

Notes

References

1000s births
1063 deaths
Year of birth uncertain
French princesses
Daughters of kings